István Borzsák (24 December 1914, Monor - 9 December 2007, Budapest), was a Hungarian classical scholar who was a specialist in Roman literature. He was a member of the Hungarian Academy of Sciences.

Selected publications
Budai Ézsaiás és klasszika-filológiánk kezdetei, Akadémiai Kiadó, Budapest, 1955.
P. Cornelius Tacitus, der Geschichtsschreiber, A. Druckenmüller, Stuttgart, 1968.

References

External links
 :hu:Borzsák István
 :de:István Borzsák

1914 births
2007 deaths
People from Monor
20th-century Hungarian historians
Members of the Hungarian Academy of Sciences
Herder Prize recipients
Hungarian classical scholars
Members of the Göttingen Academy of Sciences and Humanities